William Jethro Brown (29 March 1868 – 27 May 1930), commonly referred to as Jethro Brown, was an Australian jurist and Professor of Law.

Early life
Brown was the son of James Brown, a farmer, and his wife Sophia Jane, née Torr, and was born at Mintaro, South Australia. Brown was educated at Stanley Grammar School, Watervale, South Australia, and taught for a while at Moonta Mines State School. He then studied at St John's College, Cambridge, graduating in 1890 with a double first class in the law tripos. He was called to the bar of the Middle Temple in 1891 and elected Macmahon student at St John's College in 1892.

Law career
In 1893 Brown was appointed professor of law and modern history at the University of Tasmania and held this position until 1900 (apart from 1898 when he acted as professor of law in the University of Sydney). In 1898 he published as a pamphlet Why Federate, which had been read before the Australasian Association for the Advancement of Science. It was a crucial year for the cause of Federation, and Brown did good service in pointing out that the difficulties were mostly of a mechanical character. In 1899 appeared his thoughtful study The New Democracy, and in 1900 he left Australia to become professor of constitutional law and history at University College London. In the following year he was appointed professor of comparative law at the University College of Wales. He was examiner for the Cambridge law tripos 1902–1905, and for the University of London from 1905–1906. In 1906 he became professor of law at the University of Adelaide, holding the position for 10 years. His The Austinian Theory of Law, an edition with critical notes and excursus of lectures I, V and VI of Austin's Jurisprudence and of his Essay on the Uses of the Study of Jurisprudence, was published in 1906 and was reprinted several times. In 1912 he published The Underlying Principles of Modern Legislation, which was welcomed as a real contribution to political thought; a fifth edition appeared in April 1917. In this volume Brown points out that the likelihood of greatly increased state activity in the future throws a great responsibility on the teacher and the brains and character of the community; and that problems will arise that will demand enlightened statesmanship no less than reforming zeal. Brown did not attempt to set out his own views on the settlements of particular problems. The book was planned as a university textbook, and he held that the writer in a book of that kind "ought to be careful in expressing personal opinions about problems of which the precise solution is very debatable". Next appeared the volume The Prevention and Control of Monopolies, where he is more constructive, but always endeavours to hold the scales evenly. He was appointed president of the industrial court of South Australia in 1916 and showed great industry, courtesy and ability in carrying out his duties. His experiences as chairman of the sugar commission in 1912–14 and on other occasions as chairman of the price regulations commission, the foodstuffs commission, and the gas commission, enabled. him to gain much knowledge of the conditions in industry.

Late life and legacy
Brown's health began to fail and in July 1927 he resigned his position. He died at Adelaide of pneumonia on 27 May 1930. Brown held the LLD. degree of the University of Cambridge, and received the degree of Litt. D. from the University of Dublin for his The New Democracy. Brown married Aimée Loth in 1900 who survived him with a son, the marriage was a dismal one. Brown also contributed a long essay "The Judicial Regulation of Industrial Conditions" to Australia, Economic and Political Studies, edited by Meredith Atkinson. He also wrote largely for the reviews, including the Law Quarterly Review, the Hibbert Journal, the International Journal of Ethics, the Westminster Review, the Independent Review, the Juridical Review, the Columbia Law Review and the Yale Law Journal.

His replacement was Coleman Phillipson (1875/1878?–1958), who occupied the chair from 1919 to 1925.

References

Michael Roe, 'Brown, William Jethro (1868 - 1930)', Australian Dictionary of Biography, Volume 7, MUP, 1979, pp 447–448. 

1868 births
1930 deaths
Australian jurists
Australian educators
Academics of University College London
Academics of Aberystwyth University
Alumni of St John's College, Cambridge
Members of the Middle Temple